Eubranchus rubropunctatus is a species of sea slug or nudibranch, a marine gastropod mollusc in the family Eubranchidae.

Distribution
This species was described from among roots of eel grass (Cymodocea ciliata) at Oyster bay, Dar-es-Salaam, Tanzania. It has been reported from Heron Island, Queensland, Australia.

References

Eubranchidae
Gastropods described in 1969